FK Lokomotíva Devínska Nová Ves, also known as FCL DNV, is a Slovak football club based in Devínska Nová Ves, a borough of the capital Bratislava. It plays in the 3rd League.

History 

Football club in Devínska Nová Ves was established in 1923 under the name ŠK Devínska Nová Ves. A few years later became the Devínska another club called Red Star. In 1927 changed its name to ŠK Slovan Devínska Nová Ves. In 1929 Red Star disappeared and ceased to operate and Slovan. In early 1930, however, a new club Slovan ŠK Devínska Nová Ves. The first football field in Devínska Nová Ves was in the area Grba. Later on, the ground moved for a new municipal People's School. The current stadium at the limestone street itself is built in 1964. In period of the Second World War the Devínska Nova Ves, Bratislava, and the best neighboring clubs. At that time, had its name from time to adapt to the Sports Section of Hlinka Guard Devínska Nová Ves. After the war began in 1945 footballers of Devínska Nová Ves in the West Division with a team of Nitra, Pezinok, Topoľčany, Nové Zámky, Hlohovec and Slovan Bratislava B. In the postwar years has Devínska Nová Ves very good young team. in the year 1946/47 has played the title Slovak champion. Only in the final group of western give adolescents Spartak Trnava. The successful performance in this period is greatly deserved Longtime chairman Jozef Schrek. Since 1949 the club name Sokol Devínska Nová Ves. With a performance of football to go down with water. The rise occurs again after the year 1953 (already TJ Lokomotíva Devínska Nová Ves).

In 1956 won Devínska Nová Ves in the southwestern county Championship. Young at the time to do young leagues. The popularity of football in Devínska Nová Ves demonstrates the fact, that in the year 1987/88 has played to 7 teams. Among the coaches to develop football in Devínska Nová Ves deserved Ján Baláž, Ladislav Horváth, Milan Moravec, Vojtech Skyva, Karol Borhy, Emil Pažický, Karol Jokl, Ján Turner, Miroslav Kucharič, Vladimír Hrivnák and others. In 1993 TJ Lokomotíva renamed FCL Devínska Nová Ves. Football Club is the most massive organization in Devínska Nová Ves. Among the most famous footballers of Devinska Nova Ves include Juraj Tóth, who played for ŠK Slovan Bratislava. In the season 1999/2000 occupied Lokomotíva 3rd place in the III. League, which is the best location in the history of the club. A few years later, the club fell to within 5th leagues. There are currently FCL DNV in 4th league. In 2009 attended three players from Devínska Nová Ves Walter Rischer, Juraj Šašík and Michal Polák European Amateurs Championships. Coach was Ľubomír Bohúň.

Historical names 
 ŠK Devínska Nova Ves
 ŠK Slovan Devínska Nová Ves
 ŠOHG Devínska Nová Ves
 Sokol Devínska Nová Ves
 TJ Lokomotíva Devínska Nová Ves
 FCL Devínska Nová Ves
 FK Lokomotíva Devínska Nová Ves

Achievements 
 3rd Slovak League '
 5th place: 2000

Current squad 

(captain)

Club Officials 
Chairman: František Hupka
Manager: Peter Zukal
Director: Roland Vítko
Coach: Jozef Balog
Assist coach: Karol Schulz
Assist coach: Ján Sabo
Masseuse: Alexandra Megoová

External links
Lokomotíva official site
Bratislavský futbalový zväz
Devínska Nová Ves

Lokomotiva Devinska Nova Ves
Association football clubs established in 1923
1923 establishments in Slovakia
Football clubs in Bratislava